Rocafort is a Barcelona Metro station, named after the Carrer de Rocafort, in the Eixample district of the city of Barcelona. The station is served by line L1.

The station is located under the Gran Via de les Corts Catalanes between the Carrer de Rocafort and the Carrer de Calàbria. The station can be accessed from entrances on the Gran Via, the Carrer de Rocafort and the Carrer de Calàbria.

Rocafort is on the original section of line L1 (then the Ferrocarril Metropolitano Transversal de Barcelona) between Catalunya and Bordeta stations, which was opened in 1926.

References

External links

Barcelona Metro line 1 stations
Railway stations in Spain opened in 1926